David E. Reese (November 19, 1892 – June 26, 1978) was an American football end who played four seasons with the Dayton Triangles of the National Football League (NFL). He played college football at Denison University.  Reese was the first commissioner of the Mid-American Conference (MAC), serving from 1946 to 1964.

References

1892 births
1978 deaths
American football ends
Denison Big Red football players
Dayton Triangles players
Mid-American Conference commissioners
People from Stark County, Ohio
Players of American football from Ohio